Qeshm County is in Hormozgan province, Iran. The capital of the county is the city of Qeshm. At the 2006 census, the county's population was 103,881 in 22,642 households. The following census in 2011 counted 117,774 people in 28,798 households. At the 2016 census, the county's population was 148,993 in 40,506 households. Qeshm is a free trade zone and has good potential for business.

Administrative divisions

The population history of Qeshm County's administrative divisions over three consecutive censuses is shown in the following table. The latest census shows three districts, seven rural districts, and four cities.

References

 

Counties of Hormozgan Province